The BSRB (formerly Bandalag Starfsmanna Ríkis og Bæja) or Confederation of State and Municipal Employees of Iceland is a federation of trade union in Iceland. It was formed in 1942 and is the largest federation of employees in the public sector in Iceland with 25 member unions with over 21,000 members in total. About two in every three members are women.

The  BSRB is affiliated with the International Trade Union Confederation, the European Trade Union Confederation, the Council of Nordic Trade Unions and Public Services International.

References

External links
 www.bsrb.is 

Trade unions in Iceland
International Trade Union Confederation
European Trade Union Confederation
Council of Nordic Trade Unions
Public Services International
Trade unions established in 1942
1942 establishments in Iceland